is a consumer product for programming on the Nintendo Family Computer, the Japanese equivalent to the Nintendo Entertainment System. Family BASIC  was launched on June 21, 1984, to consumers in Japan by Nintendo, in cooperation with Hudson Soft and Sharp Corporation. A second version titled Family BASIC V3 was released on February 21, 1985, with greater memory and new features.

Overview
The first edition of the Family BASIC application cartridge is bundled with a computer style keyboard and instructional textbook, and requires a cassette tape recorder to save user-generated BASIC programs. Programs can be saved using any cassette tape drive, such as the Famicom Data Recorder. Family BASIC was not designed to be compatible with floppy disk storage on the Famicom Disk System and the Disk System's RAM adapter requires the use of the Famicom's cartridge slot, which prevents using the slot for the Family BASIC cartridge.

Family BASIC includes a dialect of the BASIC programming language enhanced for game development. Its Microsoft BASIC-derived command set is extended with support for sprites, animation, backgrounds, musical sequences, and gamepads. Several visual components seen in Nintendo games, such as backgrounds and characters from the Mario and Donkey Kong series , are made available as Family BASIC development componentry, or appear in premade Family BASIC games.

Like Integer BASIC and Tiny BASIC, the Family BASIC interpreter only supports integers. It is based on Hudson Soft BASIC for the Sharp MZ80. Its keywords are in English.

Development
Family BASIC was released in Japan by Nintendo for the Family Computer on June 21, 1984, in Japan. As part of a collaboration between Nintendo, Sharp Corporation, and Hudson Soft, it was created to attract computer users over to the new Famicom. Koji Kondo wrote a section in the instruction manual for programming Japanese popular music in the game, as his second project for Nintendo. Prior to this, Kondo had become interested in producing music through computers by programming sound effects in BASIC on his home computer. Two revisions of Family BASIC were produced — the first, "v.2.1", was released shortly after production of the game begun, and the second, "v.3.0", was released in early 1985. v.3.0 features expanded memory and several minigames built-in to the programming cartridge, indicated by a red cartridge shell.

Reception
Family BASIC was commercially successful, with more than 400,000 units sold by the end of the 1980s.

In a 2011 retrospective review, Retro Gamer thought it was a "some-what useless" peripheral for the Famicom due to its high price point and lack of compatibility with the Famicom Disk System, although they found it to be an interesting collection piece for its rarity and overall concept.

In IGN's 2013 retrospective of the Famicom's library that was lost to audiences outside Japan, Lucas Thomas called Family BASIC "a legitimate home computing solution". He criticized the interface as "nebulous to navigate" but wondered how "it would have been fun to see what America and Europe's often brilliant hobbyist game developers of the '80s could have crafted with these tools in hand".

Legacy
Cho Ren Sha 68K designer Koichi "Famibe No Yosshin" Yoshida used Family BASIC to create two shoot 'em up games titled Zacner and Zacner II. Satoshi Tajiri, creator of Pokémon, initially used Family BASIC as a gateway to build his understanding of the internal operation of the Famicom. This inspired him to create his own handmade Famicom game development hardware, and make Game Freak's debut game Quinty, later released as Mendel Palace (1990).

Notes

References

External links

Mario video games
BASIC interpreters
Discontinued BASICs
Nintendo Entertainment System accessories
Video game development software
BASIC programming language family